11 Freunde (German for 11 friends) is a monthly German sports magazine.

The magazine was founded in 2000 by Reinaldo Coddou H. and Philipp Köster. Köster is also its editor-in-chief. It is published monthly in Berlin.

The magazine sees itself within the tradition of English football magazines like When Saturday Comes, or the German "Der tödliche Pass".

The magazine's name was inspired by a quote from a football tactics book by Richard Girulatis (1920): "", which can be translated as if you want to win, you have to be eleven friends.

Since 2010 a jury elects the best footballing actors every year. Player, manager, coaching team, newcomer, character, referee, fan initiative of the year.

History
Since 2009 an enclosure for women football is made, 11 Freundinnen.

Since 2010 the magazine elects the best footballing actors. Player, manager, coach, newcomer, character.

Since 2017 it elects coaching team of the year, instead of coach of the year, and the referee of the year is elected.

See also
 List of magazines in Germany

References

External links
 Official website
 :wikiquote:de:Richard Girulatis Girulatis quoted in WikiQuote

2000 establishments in Germany
Association football magazines
Football mass media in Germany
German-language magazines
Magazines established in 2000
Magazines published in Berlin
Mass media in Cologne
Monthly magazines published in Germany
Sports magazines published in Germany